The 2013 Tour de France was the 100th edition of the race, one of cycling's Grand Tours. It started on the island of Corsica on 30 June and finished on the Champs-Élysées in Paris on 21 July.

Twenty-two teams participated in the 2013 edition of the Tour de France. All of the nineteen UCI ProTeams were entitled, and obliged, to enter the race. On 27 April 2013, the organiser of the Tour, Amaury Sport Organisation (ASO), announced the three second-tier UCI Professional Continental teams given wildcard invitations, all of which were French-based. The presentation of the teams took place at the harbour of Porto-Vecchio on 28 June, two days before the start of opening stage held in the town. Each team arrived by boat to the stage, before being introduced to the crowd.

Each squad was allowed a maximum of nine riders, therefore the start list contained a total of 198 riders. Of these, 54 were riding the Tour de France for the first time. From the riders that began this edition, 169 completed the race. The average age of all the riders was 29.45, with 19-year-old Danny van Poppel the youngest rider and 41-year-old Jens Voigt the oldest. Of the total average ages,  was the youngest team and  the oldest. The riders came from 34 countries; France, Spain, Italy, Netherlands, Australia, Belgium and Germany all had 10 or more riders in the race. Riders from ten countries won at least one stage; German riders won the largest number of stages, a total of six.

Marcel Kittel was the first rider to wear the general classification's yellow jersey after winning stage one. Simon Gerrans gained the race lead after his team, won the stage four team time trial. Gerrans passed the lead on to teammate Daryl Impey after the fifth stage. Chris Froome of  took the lead from Impey after the eighth stage, the first classified as mountainous. Froome maintained his lead for the remainder of the race by consolidating his lead through solid performances in the individual time trials and in the high mountains. Second and third respectively were Nairo Quintana and Joaquim Rodríguez. In the race's other classifications, Quintana won the mountains classification and also finished as the best young rider in the general classification, finishing in second place overall; Peter Sagan of the  team was the winner of the points classification, with  finishing as the winners of the team classification. Christophe Riblon  was given the award for the most combative rider.

Teams

ProTeams

  (riders)
  (riders)
  (riders)
  (riders)
  (riders)
  (riders)
  (riders)
  (riders)
  (riders)
  (riders)
  (riders)
  (riders)
  (riders)
  (riders)
  (riders)
  (riders)
  (riders)
  (riders)
  (riders)

Professional Continental teams

  (riders)
  (riders)
  (riders)

Cyclists

By starting number

By team

By nationality

References

Sources

External links 
 

2013 Tour de France
2013